Ukrainians in Estonia are the third largest ethnic group in Estonia after Estonians and Russians and number 28,000. 4,000 out of them are citizens of Ukraine.

Most of the Ukrainians in Estonia live in Tallinn (2,92% of the whole population) and Harjumaa; some live in Tartu and Pärnu. The representatives of the Ukrainian ethnic minority have formed over 20 national-cultural organizations. Most of the Ukrainians in Estonia support the integration of non-Estonians into Estonian society, while retaining their own cultural and ethnic particularities. For the Estonian population of Estonia, on Saturdays the fourth channel of the Estonian Radio (the Russian language channel) broadcasts Ukrainian language radio broadcast «Червона калина» ('Chervona kalina' - "Red Viburnum").

War in Ukraine 
The Police and Border Guard Board (PPA) reported that more than 34,000 refugees have arrived in Estonia since February 24 seeking refuge from war in Ukraine.

See also 
Estonia–Ukraine relations
Ukrainian diaspora
Russians in Estonia

References

 

Ethnic groups in Estonia
Estonia
Estonia